Africana philosophy is the work of philosophers of African descent and others whose work deals with the subject matter of the African diaspora. The name does not refer to a particular philosophy, philosophical system, method, or tradition. Rather, Africana philosophy is a third-order, metaphilosophical, umbrella-concept used to bring organizing oversight to various efforts of philosophizing. Africana philosophy is a part of and developed within the field of Africana studies.

Overview

Africana philosophy is a part of and developed within the field of Africana studies. Africana philosophy includes the philosophical ideas, arguments, and theories of particular concern to people of African descent. Some of the topics explored by Africana philosophy include pre-Socratic African philosophy and modern-day debates discussing the early history of Western philosophy, post-colonial writing in Africa and the Americas, black resistance to oppression, black existentialism in the United States, and the meaning of "blackness" in the modern world.

Lucius Outlaw states:

"Africana philosophy" is very much a heuristic notion—that is, one that suggests orientations for philosophical endeavors by professional philosophers and other intellectuals devoted to matters pertinent to African and African-descended persons and peoples.

Professional philosophers in the areas of ethics, social philosophy, political philosophy, philosophy of biology, semantics, critical race theory, and postcolonialism are currently exploring Africana philosophy. The American Philosophical Association has 10,000 members in North America. It is estimated that only 100 of its members in North America are of African descent.

Lewis Gordon states:

Africana philosophy is a species of Africana thought, which involves the theoretical questions raised by critical engagements with ideas in Africana cultures and their hybrid, mixed, or creolized forms worldwide. Since there was no reason for the people of the African continent to have considered themselves African until that identity was imposed upon them through conquest and colonization in the modern era... this area of thought also refers to the unique set of questions raised by the emergence of "Africans" and their diaspora here designated by the term "Africana"... Africana philosophy refers to the philosophical dimensions of this area of thought.

Branches

Branches include: African philosophy, black existentialism, double consciousness, black theology, and Africana womanism.

List of Africana philosophers

 Linda Martín Alcoff
 Anita L. Allen
 William B. Allen
 Kwame Anthony Appiah
 Molefi Kete Asante
 James Baldwin
 Yosef Ben-Jochannan
 Robert Bernasconi
 Jean-Godefroy Bidima
 Stephen Biko
 Carole Boyce Davies
 Aimé Césaire
 John Henrik Clarke
 Anna Julia Cooper
 Kimberlé Williams Crenshaw
 Tommy J. Curry
 Léon Damas
 Angela Davis
 Martin Delany
 Cheikh Anta Diop
 Frederick Douglass
 Nah Dove
 W. E. B. Du Bois
 Emmanuel Chukwudi Eze
 Frantz Fanon
 Grant Farred
 Anténor Firmin
 William Fontaine
 Marcus Garvey
 Nigel Gibson
 David Theo Goldberg
 Lewis Gordon
 Kwame Gyekye
 Leonard Harris
 Hubert Harrison
 Asa Hilliard
 bell hooks
 Paulin Hountondji
 Abiola Irele
 C. L. R. James
 Martin Luther King Jr.
 Alain Locke
 Audre Lorde
  Achille Mbembe
 John H. McClendon
 Charles Mills
 Michele Moody-Adams
 Toni Morrison
 Fred Moten
 V. Y. Mudimbe
 Anthony B. Pinn
 Adrian Piper
 Léopold Sédar Senghor
 Tommie Shelby
 John Olubi Sodipo
 Kenneth Allen Taylor
 Laurence Thomas
 Booker T. Washington
 Cornel West
 John Edgar Wideman
 Kwasi Wiredu

List of scholarly and academic journals

 Philosophia Africana

References

Further reading
 An Introduction to Africana Philosophy by Lewis Gordon
 Philosophy Born of Struggle by Leonard Harris
 Race and Racism in Continental Philosophy by Robert Bernasconi
 A Companion to African-American Philosophy by Tommy L. Lott and John Pittman
 African-American Perspectives and Philosophical Traditions by John P. Pittman
 Blacks and Social Justice by Bernard R. Boxill
 African American Philosophers by George Yancy
 Black Skin, White Masks by Frantz Fanon
 Philosophies Africaines, Jean-Godefroy Bidima ed., Collège international de philosophie journal Rue Descartes, 2002.
Outlaw, Jr., L., “Africana Philosophy: Origins and Prospects,” in Kwasi Wiredu (ed.), A Companion to African Philosophy, Malden, MA: Blackwell, pp. 90–98.

External links

 Africana philosophy from Stanford encyclopedia of philosophy.
Collection of articles on Africana philosophy in Philpapers.
 Caribbean Philosophical Association

Africana philosophy
African philosophy
African diaspora